Davíð Tómas Tómasson (born October 21, 1988) is an Icelandic FIBA referee and a musician.

Refereeing
In 2017, Davíð was named an official FIBA referee. In 2019, Davíð was barred from refeering ÍR's games during the Úrvalsdeild karla playoffs after he posted an Instagram picture of himself and ÍR player Matthías Orri Sigurðarson, alluding to their connection to the Vesturbær district in Reykjavík.

Musical career
Davíð has performed under the name Dabbi T since his late teenage years. At the age of sixteen, he released his first single, Þröngar píkur (English: Tight Pussies). In 2007 he released the rap album Óheflað málfar (English: Unrestricted Speech). He was a member of the group 32c along with Emmsjé Gauti and Nagmús. In 2017, Davíð released the album T, his first album in ten years.

Albums
Solo
2007: Óheflað málfar
2017: T

Singles
2004: Þröngar píkur
2016: Blár

Personal life
Davíð's sister is basketball referee Georgía Olga Kristiansen. On December 7, 2017, they became the first siblings to officiate together a highest competitive tier game in Iceland.

References

1988 births
Living people
FIBA referees
David Tomas Tomasson
David Tomas Tomasson
David Tomas Tomasson
David Tomas Tomasson